Vanda falcata, also known as 风兰 (feng lan) in Chinese, 풍란 (pungnan) in Korean, 風蘭 (fūran) in Japanese, or the wind orchid in English, is a species of orchid found in China, Korea, and Japan. It was formerly classified in the genus Neofinetia.

Named cultivars selected for characteristics including variegation, flower color or form, and vegetative form are often referred to as 富貴蘭 (fūkiran) in Japan. Due to these highly variable mutant forms this species has been proposed as a model organism for floral development in orchids.

Description 
Plants are 8–12 cm tall on monopodial stems of 1–6 cm. There are usually between 4 and 20 narrowly oblong-falcate (hence the epithet) leaves of 5–12 cm. that are leathery and sheathed at the base. The inflorescence, including flowers, is 5–8 cm. long, suberect, and carries as few as two, and as many as 10 fragrant, white flowers, each with a characteristic curved spur. 2n = 38.

Ecology 
Vanda falcata grows as an epiphyte on the branches and trunks of both deciduous and evergreen trees, and occasionally as a lithophyte on rock cliffs and man-made stone walls. Numerous whitish roots grow from the base of the plant, anchoring it to its host or substrate and collecting nutrients washed down from above. These roots are accustomed to excellent air movement. An adult in an optimal situation will produce numerous offsets.

Within V. falcata'''s range summer temperatures average 26–31 °C. during the day and 18–23 °C. at night. Average humidity is 80–85% in summer, and about 75% during the rest of the seasons. Plants receive heaviest rainfall during East Asian rainy season: June and July in southern Japan. Blooming time is usually synchronized with the monsoon, although plants may very occasionally bloom as late as December.

PollinationVanda falcata has been reported to be pollinated by several hawkmoth species of the genus Theretra, namely Theretra japonica and Theretra nessus.

 Taxonomy 
Taxonomic history
The type specimen was introduced to the West from Japan by Carl Peter Thunberg in 1784, and it was described as Orchis falcata. For the next hundred years and more, the species was renamed and moved in and out of many of the Asian sarcanthoid genera, in addition to the African genus Angraecum. Finally, in 1925 H. H. Hu created Neofinetia as a monotypic genus. Two other species were included in Neofinetia, before the genus was reduced to synonymy with Vanda.

PhylogenyVanda falcata has been identified as sister group to Vanda richardsiana. These two species are the sister group to Vanda xichangensis, as can be seen in the following cladogram:

Horticulture
 History of cultivation 
The first documented records of V. falcata appear during the Kanbun era (1661-1673) Japan, later reaching a peak in popularity during the middle of the Edo period with a marked increase in the number of cultivated varieties. At this time, because the numerous cultivated varieties of the species were primarily enjoyed by the daimyō and other wealthy or high ranked citizens, the cultivated varieties were given the designation of fūkiran (富貴蘭), translating to "orchid of wealth and rank".

 Culture Vanda falcata is a warm to cool grower. Plants may be mounted on slabs of cork or tree-fern fiber. In Japan, the custom is to grow them on a raised mound of sphagnum moss. The plants benefit from a cool, bright winter rest, and frequent watering when in growth.

 Hybrids 
Most hybrid names are now obsolete, as several genera were reduced to synonymy with Vanda.
(As listed by the RHS:)
 Aeridofinetia Hiroshima Choice — Aerides flabellata × Neof. falcata, M.Kobayashi 1995
 Aeridofinetia Pink Pearl — Aerides jarckiana × Neof. falcata, E.Iwanaga 1961
 Aeridofinetia Tiny Tim — Aerides falcata × Neof. falcata, W.K.Nakamoto 1966
 Aeridofinetia Suzuka Pearl — Neof. falcata × Aerides houlletiana, S.Katsuta 2007
 Ascofinetia A. F. Buckman — Neof. falcata × Ascocentrum christensonianum, A.Buckman 2008
 Ascofinetia Emly — Ascofinetia Peaches × Neof. falcata, E.Siegerist 1982
 Ascofinetia Color Burst — Neof. falcata × Ascocentrum Sidhi Gold, L.Soule(Kultana) 2006
 Ascofinetia Cherry Blossom — Neof. falcata × Ascocentrum ampullaceum, E.Iwanaga 1961
 Ascofinetia Furuse — Neof. falcata × Ascocentrum pumilum, H.Furuse 1979
 Ascofinetia Kaori — Neof. falcata × Ascofinetia Cherry Blossom, I.Mochizuki 1990
 Ascofinetia Lion Star — Neof. falcata × Ascocentrum Sagarik Gold, L.Stern 1984
 Ascofinetia Peaches — Neof. falcata × Ascocentrum curvifolium, E.Iwanaga 1962
 Ascofinetia Twinkle — Neof. falcata × Ascocentrum miniatum, Rev.M.Yamada 1960
 Ascofinetia Yellow Fuuran — Neof. falcata × Ascocentrum sp., O/U 2000
 Chrisnetia Green Light — Christensonia vietnamica × Neof. falcata, Ching Hua 2008
 Cleisofinetia Rumrill Cameo — Cleisocentron pallens × Neof. falcata, J.Rumrill 1987
 Darwinara Charm — Neof. falcata × Vascostylis Tham Yuen Hae, Takaki O.N. 1987
 Darwinara Fuchs Cream Puff — Neof. falcata × Vascostylis Five Friendships, R.F.Orchids 1995
 Darwinara Pretty Girl — Neof. falcata × Vascostylis Jim Snider, Takaki O.N. 1989
 Dorifinetia Little Cherry — Dorifinetia Pilialoha × Neof. falcata, Takaki O.N. 1989
 Dorifinetia Pilialoha — Doritis pulcherrima × Neof. falcata, Mr/Mrs H.Starke (Y.Sagawa) 1975
 Jisooara Jisco — Rhynchofadanda Porchina Blue × Neof. falcata, R.Perreira 1987
 Hanesara Golden Beauty — Neof. falcata × Aeridachnis Bogor, J.Hanes 1977
 Luinetia Rumrill — Neof. falcata × Luisia teres, J.Rumrill 1975
 Mizunoara Pololei Sunset — Neof. falcata × Kagawara Christie Low, Haiku Maui (N.Mizuno) 2005
 Nakamotoara Blanc — Ascocenda Charm × Neof. falcata, Rev.M.Yamada 1965
 Nakamotoara Cherry Hill — Neof. falcata × Ascocenda Aroonsri Beauty, M.Sato 1990
 Nakamotoara Dainty Delight — Ascocenda Ophelia × Neof. falcata, Rod McLellan Co. 1980
 Nakamotoara Joyce Hands — Neof. falcata × Ascocenda Blue Boy, G.Hands(O/U) 2007
 Nakamotoara Peach Mist — Neof. falcata × Ascocenda Karnda, Arnold J.Klehm 1997
 Nakamotoara Thai Surprise — Ascocenda Peggy Foo × Neof. falcata, R.Griesbach (Bangkok Fl.Centre) 1996
 Nakamotoara Rainbow Gem — Neof. falcata × Ascocenda Flambeau, Takaki O.N. 1989
 Nakamotoara Selsal's Baby Blue — Neof. falcata × Ascocenda Blue Eyes, J.& I.Sellés 1995
 Nakamotoara Wendy — Neof. falcata × Ascocenda Meda Arnold, W.K.Nakamoto 1964
 Neofadenia Ucho — Neof. falcata × Seidenfadenia mitrata, S.Ichijyo (K.Nakatani) 1984
 Neoglossum Rumrill Dilly — Neof. falcata × Ascoglossum calopterum, J.Rumrill 1989
 Neograecum Conny Röllke — Neof. falcata × Angraecum scottianum, Röllke Orchzt. (G.Röllke) 1990
 Neosedanda (Vandofinides) Purity — Vandirea Takagi × Neof. falcata, J.Rumrill 1980
 Neosedirea Summer Stars — Neof. falcata × Sedirea japonica, H.Furuse 1979
 Neostylis Baby Angel — Neof. falcata × Neostylis Lou Sneary, Takaki O.N. 1989
 Neostylis Dainty — Neof. falcata × Rhynchostylis retusa, Elliott Flynn 1965
 Neostylis Lou Sneary — Neof. falcata × Rhynchostylis coelestis, Hajime Ono 1970
 Neostylis Pinky — Neof. falcata × Rhynchostylis gigantea, M.Kobayashi 1990
 Parafinetia Crownfox Twinkle — Paraphalaenopsis serpentilingua × Neof. falcata, R.F. Orchids (Cheah Wah Sang) 2009
 Phalanetia Anna Bettencourt — Neof. falcata × Phalaenopsis Veitchiana, Bettencourt 1988
 Phalanetia Hoshizukiyo — Phalanetia Irene × Neof. falcata, T.Morie 2002
 Phalanetia Irene — Neof. falcata × Phalaenopsis equestris, Y.Sagawa 1975
 Phalanetia Koibotaru — Neof. falcata × Phalaenopsis schilleriana, T.Morie 2000
 Phalanetia Pacifica — Neof. falcata × Phalaenopsis Chieftain, W.K.Nakamoto 1964
 Renanetia Bali — Renanthera Brookie Chandler × Neof. falcata, E.Iwanaga 1962
 Renanetia Sunrise — Neof. falcata × Renanthera imschootiana, Sak.Takagi 1967
 Robifinetia Rumrill Vanguard — Robiquetia spathulata × Neof. falcata, J.Rumrill 1982
 Rumrillara Salome — Rumrillara Rosyleen × Neof. falcata, J.Rumrill 1979
 Sanjumeara Luke Neo — Neof. falcata × Perreiraara Luke Thai, T.Orchids (R.Viraphandhu) 1994
 Vandofinetia Aspenwood Elf — Neof. falcata × Vanda Ben Berliner, I.Cohen (Lauralin) 1985
 Vandofinetia Baby Star — Neof. falcata × Vandofinetia Pat Arcari, Takaki O.N. 1989
 Vandofinetia Blaupunkt — Vanda coerulescens × Neof. falcata, J.Lindstrom (J.Dunkelberger) 1986
 Vandofinetia Kelly's Cloud Catcher — Neof. falcata × Vanda Sally Roth, K.Hurley (Fournier) 2009
 Vandofinetia Little Blossom — Neof. falcata × Vanda Miss Joaquim, Sak.Takagi 1967
 Vandofinetia Nago Blue — Neof. falcata × Vanda Trevor Rathbone, E.Tamaki 1996
 Vandofinetia Nara — Vanda Patou × Neof. falcata, Kirin Brew. (K.Takagi) 1992
 Vandofinetia Oriental Beauty — Neof. falcata × Vanda Rothschildiana, Takaki O.N. 1987
 Vandofinetia Oriental Star — Neof. falcata × Vanda Little Blue, Takaki O.N. 1989
 Vandofinetia Pat Arcari — Vanda coerulea × Neof. falcata, Hajime Ono 1970
 Vandofinetia Premier — Neof. falcata × Vanda lamellata, Rev.M.Yamada 1960
 Vandofinetia Red Tide — Neof. falcata × Vanda Mystic Queen, Lauralin 1989
 Vandofinetia Snow Dance — Vanda Pissamai × Neof. falcata, Suphachadiwong (Kultana) 1984
 Vandofinetia Sweet Petite — Vanda Mimi Palmer × Neof. falcata, B.Thoms 1994
 Vandofinetia Venus — Vandofinetia Premier × Neof. falcata, J.Rumrill 1984
 Vandofinetia Virgil — Neof. falcata × Vanda cristata, Highland Trop. 1992
 Vandofinetia White Crane — Vanda sanderiana × Neof. falcata, Exotic Orchids 2006
 Wilkara Didit Finally — Asconopsis Irene Dobkin × Neof. falcata'', C.Wilk 2003

Notes

References

『伝承と進化の美：富貴蘭』栃の葉書房 (2014)
『古典園芸植物　種類と作り方』ガーデンライフ編／誠文堂新光社 (1982)
『趣味の古典園芸植物』主婦の友社 (1975)
『総合種苗ガイド3　古典園芸植物編』誠文堂新光社 (1967)

falcata
Orchids of China
Orchids of Japan
Orchids of Korea
Lithophytic orchids
Epiphytic orchids
Plants described in 1784